Silvia Sommaggio (born 20 November 1969) is a retired Italian long-distance runner who specializes in the 5000 and 10,000 metres as well as cross-country and road running.

Biography
She was born in Camposampiero. Her father was Gianfranco Sommaggio, the Italian champion in 3000 metres steeplechase in 1961 and 1962. Herself, Sommaggio became Italian 5000 metres champion in 1995 and 10,000 metres champion in 1997 and 2000. She became indoor champion in the 3000 metres in 2000.

In the 5000 metres she competed at the 1995 World Championships and the 1996 Olympic Games without reaching the final, and won the silver medal at the 1995 Summer Universiade in Fukuoka. In the 10,000 metres she competed at the 1996 Olympic Games without reaching the final, before winning the silver medal at the 1997 Mediterranean Games. She also finished ninth at the 1997 World Championships in Athens and fourth at the 2001 Mediterranean Games. In her third Olympic race, the 2000 Olympic 10,000 metres, she again failed to reach the final. In the 3000 metres she competed at the 1994 European Championships and at the 2000 European Indoor Championships without reaching the final.

Sommaggio also competed in cross-country and road races. Her best finish at the World Cross Country Championships was 31st in 2000. She finished 28th at the 2001 World Half Marathon Championships, 36th at the 2002 World Half Marathon Championships and 30th at the 2006 World Road Running Championships.

In the 3000 metres her personal best time was 8:59.18 minutes (indoor), achieved in August 1975 in Nice; in the 5000 metres she had 15:20.89 minutes, achieved at the 1995 World Championships; and in the 10,000 metres she had 31:24.12 minutes, achieved in August 2000 in Heusden. In the half marathon she had 1:12:14 hours, achieved at the 2001 World Half Marathon Championships; and in the marathon she has 2:36:29 hours, achieved in April 2005 in Padova.

Achievements

See also
 Italian all-time lists - 5000 metres
 Italian all-time lists - 10000 metres

References

External links
 

1969 births
Living people
People from Camposampiero
Italian female long-distance runners
Italian female steeplechase runners
Athletes (track and field) at the 1996 Summer Olympics
Athletes (track and field) at the 2000 Summer Olympics
Olympic athletes of Italy
Universiade medalists in athletics (track and field)
World Athletics Championships athletes for Italy
Mediterranean Games silver medalists for Italy
Mediterranean Games medalists in athletics
Athletes (track and field) at the 1997 Mediterranean Games
Athletes (track and field) at the 2001 Mediterranean Games
Universiade silver medalists for Italy
Medalists at the 1995 Summer Universiade
Sportspeople from the Province of Padua